Parliamentary elections were held in Chile on 7 March 1965. The Christian Democratic Party, led by Eduardo Frei Montalva, won a majority of seats in the Chamber of Deputies, the first time a party had held a majority for several decades. The party also became the largest party in the Senate.

Electoral system
The term length for Senators was eight years, with around half of the Senators elected every four years. This election saw 21 of the 45 Senate seats up for election.

Results

Senate

Chamber of Deputies

References

Elections in Chile
Chile
Parliamentary
Presidency of Eduardo Frei Montalva
Chile
Election and referendum articles with incomplete results